Hippocampus pusillus, the pygmy thorny seahorse, is only known from specimens that were dredged at depths between 35 and 228m off the coast of New Caledonia.

References 

pusillus
Taxa named by Ronald Fricke
Fish described in 2004